The Division of Indi (pronounced ) is an Australian electoral division in the state of Victoria. The division is located in the north-east of the state, adjoining the border with New South Wales. The largest settlements in the division are the regional cities of Wodonga, Wangaratta, and Benalla. Other towns in the electorate include Rutherglen, Mansfield, Beechworth, Myrtleford, Bright, Alexandra, Tallangatta, Corryong and a number of other small villages (including the ski resort of Falls Creek). While Indi is one of the largest electorates in Victoria, much of it is located within the largely uninhabited Australian Alps. While Wodonga serves as a regional hub for much of the more heavily populated northern part of the electorate, the southern part is closer to Melbourne than Wodonga.

The current member for Indi, since the 2019 federal election, is independent Helen Haines.

Geography
Since 1984, federal electoral division boundaries in Australia have been determined at redistributions by a redistribution committee appointed by the Australian Electoral Commission. Redistributions occur for the boundaries of divisions in a particular state, and they occur every seven years, or sooner if a state's representation entitlement changes or when divisions of a state are malapportioned.

History

Indi has existed continuously since Federation. The division was proclaimed in 1900, and was one of the original 65 divisions to be contested at the first federal election. The most nationally prominent person to represent Indi to date was the first, Sir Isaac Isaacs, who rose to become Attorney-General of Australia, Chief Justice of the High Court of Australia, and the first Australian-born Governor-General of Australia. Another member for Indi, John "Black Jack" McEwen, was a long-serving Minister and was briefly Prime Minister of Australia after the death of Harold Holt in 1967, but he was member for Murray by then. Indi has been held by a member of a conservative party (either the Liberal Party and its predecessors or the National Party) or a conservative independent for all but four terms since Federation, and without interruption since 1931. Labor last won the seat in 1928 when the Country incumbent forgot to renominate, and retained it in 1929. Since 2004, the Liberal primary vote has been in decline, falling from 63% in 2004, to 54% in 2007, 53% in 2010, 44% in 2013 and 27% in 2016. In 2019, the Liberal primary vote rose slightly to 35% before falling again, in 2022, to 31%.

At the 2013 election, independent Cathy McGowan unseated Liberal Party incumbent Sophie Mirabella, the only incumbent Liberal MP to lose his or her seat at the 2013 election. This was considered a major upset; Mirabella had gone into the election sitting on a margin of 59 percent, on the stronger side of fairly safe. Indeed, in a "traditional" two-party matchup, Mirabella would have retained the seat with a small swing in her favour against Labor.

McGowan retained Indi against Mirabella at the 2016 election with an increased 54.8% (+4.6) two-candidate-preferred vote. The Liberal "traditional" two-party-preferred vote was reduced to 54.4% (–4.7) against Labor's 45.6% (+4.7), a marginal two-party result not seen since the 1929 election.

McGowan retired in 2019 and was succeeded by fellow independent Haines, who suffered a swing of four percent against the Liberals from McGowan's 2016 vote and was elected on Labor preferences.

Members

Election results

References

External links
 Division of Indi – Australian Electoral Commission

Electoral divisions of Australia
Constituencies established in 1901
1901 establishments in Australia
Hume (region)
Wangaratta
Wodonga
Shire of Indigo
Shire of Mansfield
Alpine Shire
Rural City of Benalla
Shire of Murrindindi
Shire of Towong